Jamal Manakkadan (born 21 May 1961) is an Indian Politician from the state of Kerala . He was the Municipal Chairman of Kalamassery Municipality for the 2010 to 2015 period  in Ernakulam District. It was the third time he was elected as the chairman of the Kalamassery Municipality. He is a leader of Indian National Congress. Manakkadan started his political career through the Kerala Students Union (KSU) during college times. He also served as the Chairman of Chamber of Municipal Chairman.

References

1961 births
Living people
Indian National Congress politicians from Kerala
Politicians from Kochi